Lectionary 2276, designated by ℓ 2276 in the Gregory-Aland numbering, is a Greek manuscript of the New Testament, on parchment leaves, dated paleographically to the 12th, 13th or 14th century.

Description 

It is written in Greek minuscule letters, on 55 parchment leaves (29.2 by 23 cm), 2 columns per page, 28 lines per page. The codex contains the weekday Gospel  Lessons (Evangelistarium), which were read from Easter to Pentecost and Saturday/Sunday Gospel lessons for the other weeks.

It is dated by the INTF to the 13th or 14th century.

The codex now is located in the Bible Museum Münster (MS. 21).

See also 

 List of New Testament lectionaries
 Biblical manuscripts
 Textual criticism
 Bible Museum Münster

References

External links 
 Lectionary 2276 Images at the CSNTM
 Manuscripts of the Bible Museum
 Description at the CSNTM

Greek New Testament lectionaries
13th-century biblical manuscripts